This is a list of current and former Roman Catholic churches in the Roman Catholic Diocese of Toledo. The diocese covers 19 counties in northwestern Ohio and includes the cities of Toledo and Sandusky. The cathedral church of the diocese is the Our Lady, Queen of the Most Holy Rosary Cathedral in Toledo.

Toledo

Sandusky

Other areas

References

 
Toledo